The Orange Crush Defense was the 3–4 defense of the Denver Broncos during the late 1970s and early 1980s.  The National Football League (NFL) team adopted the 3–4 defense during the 1976 season, and the nickname "Orange Crush" for the team's defense was popularized early in the 1977 season by sportswriter/broadcaster Woody Paige.

It was one of the top defenses of its time with linebackers Randy Gradishar and Tom Jackson, with Gradishar as a potential Pro Football Hall of Fame selection. Other key players were defensive linemen Paul Smith (a three-time Pro Bowl selection), Barney Chavous, Lyle Alzado, and Rubin Carter, linebackers Bob Swenson and Joe Rizzo, and defensive backs Billy Thompson, Louis Wright, Steve Foley, and Bernard Jackson.

In early 1977, head coach John Ralston stepped down after his best season and New England offensive line coach Red Miller was brought in to guide an already talented team to their first ever playoff berth. The defense was already showing signs of dominance. By Week 7 of the 1977 season, the Broncos were 6–0 and the defense was well known as “The Orange Crush Defense,” giving up a total of 46 points during those games.

The defense was led by coordinator Joe Collier, defensive line coach Stan Jones (inducted into the Pro Football Hall of Fame in 1991), and first-year head coach Red Miller. Denver was 12–2 in the regular season, made its first-ever post-season appearance, and advanced to Super Bowl XII in New Orleans after home playoff wins over Pittsburgh and Oakland, winners of the previous three Super Bowls. The 1977 Broncos had the NFL's number-one defense against the rush and were a respectable 11th (of 28 teams) against the pass using the NFL Passer Rating score.  The third fewest in the league, they only let up 10.6 points per game.

The team's defensive unit derived the nickname from their orange home jerseys and a popular soft drink, Orange Crush. This delighted the makers of the soft drink, based in Illinois near Chicago.

The use of the term has resurfaced in recent years, most notably in reference to the Broncos' 2015 season.

References

External links
True Gridiron Grit (Denver Post Article)
Pro Football Reference

Denver Broncos
Nicknamed groups of American football players